The 2017–18 season will be Debreceni VSC's 40th competitive season, 25th consecutive season in the OTP Bank Liga and 115th year in existence as a football club.

First team squad

Transfers

Summer

In:

Out:

Winter

In:

Out:

Competitions

Nemzeti Bajnokság I

League table

Results summary

Results by round

Matches

Hungarian Cup

Statistics

Appearances and goals
Last updated on 2 June 2018.

|-
|colspan="14"|Youth players:

|-
|colspan="14"|Players no longer at the club:

|}

Top scorers
Includes all competitive matches. The list is sorted by shirt number when total goals are equal.

Last updated on 2 June 2018

Disciplinary record
Includes all competitive matches. Players with 1 card or more included only.

Last updated on 2 June 2018

Overall
{|class="wikitable"
|-
|Games played || 42 (33 OTP Bank Liga and 9 Hungarian Cup)
|-
|Games won || 18 (12 OTP Bank Liga and 6 Hungarian Cup)
|-
|Games drawn || 9 (8 OTP Bank Liga and 1 Hungarian Cup)
|-
|Games lost || 15 (13 OTP Bank Liga and 2 Hungarian Cup)
|-
|Goals scored || 78
|-
|Goals conceded || 59
|-
|Goal difference || +19
|-
|Yellow cards || 78
|-
|Red cards || 3
|-
|rowspan="1"|Worst discipline ||  Dániel Tőzsér (10 , 0 )
|-
|rowspan="1"|Best result || 10–1 (A) v Csongrád - Magyar Kupa - 20-09-2017
|-
|rowspan="2"|Worst result || 0–4 (A) v Puskás Akadémia - Magyar Kupa - 18-04-2018
|-
| 0–4 (A) v Balmazújváros - Nemzeti Bajnokság I - 19-05-2018
|-
|rowspan="1"|Most appearances ||  Dániel Tőzsér (37 appearances)
|-
|rowspan="1"|Top scorer ||  Haris Tabaković (13 goals)
|-
|Points || 63/126 (50.0%)
|-

References

External links
 Official Website 
 UEFA
 fixtures and results

Debreceni VSC seasons
Debrecen